Ahn Jae-chang (Hangul:안재창, born 1 October 1972); is a retired badminton player from South Korea.

Ahn in his playing career won the Hungarian International and the Canada Open. He was also part of the Korean team that won the World mixed team championships in 1991 by defeating defending champions Indonesia in the final and has represented his country in many other team competitions. After his playing career he coached Korean players team at the Youth team and National team and finally became the Head coach in late 2018. He also served as the Head Coach of the Incheon Airport Skymons pro team before.

Achievements

World Junior Championships 
The Bimantara World Junior Championships was an international invitation badminton tournament for junior players. It was held in Jakarta, Indonesia from 1987 to 1991.

IBF World Grand Prix 
The World Badminton Grand Prix sanctioned by International Badminton Federation (IBF) from 1983 to 2006.

IBF International

References 

South Korean male badminton players
Asian Games medalists in badminton
1972 births
Living people
Badminton players at the 1990 Asian Games
Badminton players at the 1994 Asian Games
Badminton players at the 1998 Asian Games
Asian Games silver medalists for South Korea
Asian Games bronze medalists for South Korea
Medalists at the 1990 Asian Games
Medalists at the 1994 Asian Games
Medalists at the 1998 Asian Games
20th-century South Korean people